Boom Boom Rocket (BBR) is a downloadable video game for Xbox 360's Xbox Live Arcade service. Boom Boom Rocket is the first rhythm game for Xbox Live Arcade and was developed by Geometry Wars creators Bizarre Creations and published by the Pogo division of Electronic Arts. The game was made backwards compatible on Xbox One on July 26, 2016.

Gameplay 
The objective of Boom Boom Rocket is to trigger fireworks explosions in time with music, in a gameplay style very similar to that of Dance Dance Revolution and Guitar Hero.  Each rocket is color-mapped to one of the colored buttons on the Xbox 360 controller.  A life gauge, which also serves as a score multiplier meter, fills with each successful shot and drains with each missed shot, and players are graded on overall hit accuracy.  If the life meter drains completely, the player fails the song and the game is over.  Each song has three unlockable firework types, one for each difficulty level.  If the player successfully triggers a prescribed number of fireworks a rocket with a wavy tail appears.  If this special rocket is triggered, the firework is unlocked and it will randomly replace other firework types on subsequent songs.  If the rocket with the wavy tail is missed, or the song is not completed, the firework type remains locked.

An update that was released in November 2007 allows the game to recognize other controllers like guitars and dance pads. When using a guitar the rockets need to be "strummed" just as in Guitar Hero to be exploded in time.

Boom Boom Rocket includes several single-player modes and a local two-player mode.  Single-player modes include the basic game, Endurance Mode (in which the song loops continuously and gradually speeds up, with the player attempting to complete as many "laps" as possible), and Practice Mode.  Additionally, the game provides a Visualizer mode, which creates a fireworks display timed to the rhythm of audio files stored on the player's console.

The game provides twelve achievements (worth 200 Gamerscore points), which focus mainly on unlocking fireworks and attaining high grade levels and hit ratios.  It also supports two-player mode on the same system, but does not support online multiplayer.  As with most Xbox Live Arcade games, the title includes online leaderboards.

Boom Boom Rocket features ten music tracks (fifteen with the update), with three difficulty levels per track.  Each track is a classical song that has been remixed into a modern style, such as ska, funk or techno. The game's music was composed by Ian Livingstone (Batman Returns and Project Gotham Racing 2 game soundtracks). While users cannot create their own custom soundtracks or utilize music from other sources (apart from the music visualizer mode), the game does support downloadable content including new tracks composed by Chris Chudley from Audioantics. (Geometry Wars, Project Gotham Racing 3) which should have been released on November 29, 2007; but were a day late. The new songs were free for a couple weeks after release.

Track list 
There are a total of ten music tracks in the game, with three difficulty levels per track. Each track is a classical song that has been remixed into one of a number of modern styles, including ska, funk and techno, and was composed by Ian Livingstone (Batman Returns and Project Gotham Racing 2 game soundtracks) and the DLC Rock Pack by Chris Chudley from Audioantics (Geometry Wars, Project Gotham Racing 3) .  The songs are as follows:

"Smooth Operetta" (from The Flower Duet)
"Rave New World" (from Dvořák's Symphony No. 9)
"William Tell Overload" (from William Tell Overture)
"Hall of the Mountain Dude" (from In the Hall of the Mountain King)
"1812 Overdrive" (from 1812 Overture)
"Valkyries Rising" (from Ride of the Valkyries)
"Tail Light Sonata" (from Beethoven's Moonlight Sonata)
"Carmen Electric" (from Carmen)
"Game Over Beethoven" (from Beethoven's Symphony No. 5)
"Toccata and Funk" (from Toccata and Fugue in D minor, BWV 565)
DLC – Rock Pack composed by Audioantics, released November 30, 2007, is:
"Sting of the Bumble Bee" (from Flight of the Bumblebee)
"Explode to Joy" (from Ode to Joy)
"Sugar High" (from Dance of the Sugar Plum Fairy)
"Eine Kleine Rochtmusik" (from Eine kleine Nachtmusik)
"Cannon in D" (from Pachelbel's Canon)

References

External links 
 Interview and screen shots at GamaSutra

2007 video games
Multiplayer online games
Music video games
Video games developed in the United Kingdom
Xbox 360 Live Arcade games
Xbox 360-only games
Xbox 360 games
Multiplayer and single-player video games
Xbox Live Arcade games
Bizarre Creations games